Jamie McGuinness (born 5 May 1990) is an English footballer who plays as a defender and is currently without a team.

Career
After spending time in Luton Town's youth system, McGuinness joined Football Conference side Rushden & Diamonds where he made five appearances during the 2008–09 season. In the 2009–10 season, McGuinness was sent on loan to Bedford Town and Weymouth before signing a permanent deal with Weymouth in 2010-11 and made 10 appearances for the club during the year.

In 2012, McGuinness moved to the U.S. and joined PDL side VSI Tampa Flames where he made 16 appearances and scored his only goal of the year in the season opener on 6 May which ended in a 4–2 defeat to Ocala Stampede. He also led the club with five assists.

On 5 February 2013, McGuinness signed with newly formed USL Pro side VSI Tampa Bay FC. He made his debut on 1 June as a substitute in an inter-league match with the Portland Timbers Reserves which ended in a 4–4 draw after Tampa Bay conceded three unanswered goals in the second half.

On 23 January 2015, it was announced that McGuiness that was the second player on the squad of Colorado Springs Switchbacks FC

McGuinness was announced on 14 April 2016 as a member of the initial roster for the Tampa Bay Rowdies' NPSL reserve side Rowdies 2. Despite being rostered with the NPSL, McGuinness never appeared in a match with Rowdies 2.

References

External links

VSI Tampa Bay FC bio

1990 births
Living people
English footballers
English expatriate footballers
Rushden & Diamonds F.C. players
Bedford Town F.C. players
Weymouth F.C. players
VSI Tampa Bay FC (PDL) players
VSI Tampa Bay FC players
IMG Academy Bradenton players
Colorado Springs Switchbacks FC players
Association football defenders
Sportspeople from Watford
Expatriate soccer players in the United States
National League (English football) players
USL League Two players
USL Championship players
Tampa Bay Rowdies 2 players
English expatriate sportspeople in the United States